Alex MacKenzie (13 January 1882 – 24 May 1947) was an Australian rules footballer who played for the St Kilda Football Club in the Victorian Football League (VFL).

Notes

External links 

1882 births
1947 deaths
Australian rules footballers from Melbourne
St Kilda Football Club players
Williamstown Football Club players
People from West Melbourne, Victoria